Aktion National Airport  is an airport serving Preveza and Lefkada in Greece. It is also known as Preveza Airport. It is also used by NATO and Hellenic Air Force Command. The airport commenced operations in 1968.

History
In December 2015, the privatisation of Aktion National Airport and 13 other regional airports of Greece was finalised with the signing of the agreement between the Fraport AG/Copelouzos Group joint venture and the state privatisation fund. "We signed the deal today", the head of Greece's privatisation agency HRADF, Stergios Pitsiorlas, told Reuters. According to the agreement, the joint venture will operate the 14 airports (including Aktion National Airport) for 40 years as of autumn 2016.

Fraport Greece’s investment plan 

On 22 March 2017, Fraport-Greece presented its master plan for the 14 Greek regional airports, including the International Airport of Chania.

Immediate actions that will be implemented at the airports, as soon as Fraport Greece takes over operations, before the launch of the 2017 summer season include:

 General clean-up
 Improving lighting, marking of airside areas
 Upgrading sanitary facilities
 Enhancing services and offering a new free Internet connection (WiFi)
 Implementing works to improve fire safety in all the areas of the airports
The following summarizes the enhancement changes that will start in October 2017 and will be implemented for Aktion National Airport under Fraport-Greece's investment plan by 2021:
 Terminal expansion by 2,381 m2 and refurbishment
 HBS inline screening
 Reorganizing airport apron area
 Refurbishing airside pavement
 75 percent increase in the number of check-in counters (from 8 to 14)
 60 percent increase in the number of departure gates (from 5 to 8)
 Doubling the number of security-check lanes (from 2 to 4)

Airlines and destinations
The following airlines operate regular scheduled and charter flights at Aktion National Airport:

Statistics

Traffic statistics by country (2022)

Accidents and incidents
On 14 July 1996, a NATO-operated E-3 Sentry (serial number LX-N90457) overran the runway and crashed into a sea wall when the pilot attempted to abort takeoff after thinking the aircraft had ingested birds. There were only minor injuries and no fatalities, however, the fuselage broke, causing total loss of the aircraft. During the investigation of the incident, no indications of bird ingestion were found. The aircraft was subsequently written off.

See also
Transport in Greece

References

External links

Airports in Greece
Preveza
Buildings and structures in Preveza (regional unit)
NATO installations in Greece